Dark Future is a post-apocalyptic miniatures wargame published by Games Workshop in 1988.

Description
Dark Future is a Mad Max-like game of vehicular combat set in an alternate world.

Setting
The game is set in a fictional alternate world United States in 1995, ten years after the American government privatised all police forces. The country has been divided into Policed Zones — mainly large cities — and Non-Policed Zones, mainly the highways and areas between cities. Ecological disaster has overtaken the country as well, with the Great Lakes having shrunk to a fraction of their size, and the Midwest turned into a desert. The players take on the role of mercenaries called "Sanctioned Operatives" or "Ops", who are hired for a variety of missions on the unpoliced highways.

Game Components  
The large 36" box comes with: 
 104-page 2-holed punched illustrated rulebook with perforated pages
 "Read Me First" quickplay rules
 17 sections of interlocking laminated track
 4 plastic cars with interchangeable weapons
 4 plastic motorcycles
 markers
 counters
 acetate range ruler
 three six-sided dice, one slightly larger than the others
 two ziplock bags for counter storage

Gameplay
Vehicles can move at their rated speed each turn, and can accomplish a variety of actions while moving including drifting, U-turning, accelerating, braking, reversing, regaining control, ramming, and firing weapons.

Scenarios
The book includes eight scenarios of increasing tactical complexity.

Publication history
In the late 1980s, GW game designer Marc Gascoigne was designing a post-apocalyptic role-playing game called Dark Future that was set in the  United States. At the same time, Richard Halliwell was designing a miniatures vehicular combat board game using many of the rules he had developed for the Judge Dredd board game Slaughter Margin. When Gascoigne's role-playing game project was shelved, his post-apocalyptic setting in the United States was grafted onto Halliwell's vehicular combat game. The merger, featuring artwork by Tony Ackland, Dave Andrews, John Blanche, Mark Craven, Carl Critchlow, Colin Dixon, David Gallagher, Pete Knifton, Mike McVey, Tim Pollard, Bil Segwick, Andrew Wildman, and Nick Williams, was published by GW in 1988 as Dark Future. At the same time, Citadel Miniatures released a line of metal miniatures that could be used with the game.

Later the same year, GW also published a game expansion, White Line Fever, that featured more vehicles and weapons, and more tactics.

Several more rules expansions and scenarios were also published in various issues of White Dwarf.

In 1990, GW published an anthology of Dark Future short stories titled Route 666, and then published a number of Dark Future novels, supposedly penned by a Sanctioned Operative named "Jack Yeovil", but actually written by Kim Newman. In 1993, Boxtree Books published a number of new Dark Futures novels, also written by Newman under the name "Jack Yeovil". In 2005, Black Flame published a number of new novels as well as republishing some of the original GW and Boxtree novels.

In May 2019, the game was released as a video game called Dark Future: Blood Red States. According to the review aggregate website Metacritic, it received "generally favorable reviews".

Reception
In the September 1989 edition of Dragon (Issue 149), Jim Bambra admired the physical components of the game, which he called "impressive." He concluded, "gamers looking for a fast-playing game of highway combat will find the Dark Future game worthy of recommendation."

In the April–May 1990 edition of Challenge (#43), John Theisen liked the simple game mechanics and the high-quality game components. But, considering the very high price of the game ($48 in 1990), he was disappointed "by a lack of versatility in design. There are only three types of vehicle and only 16 types of weapon." He pointed out that more vehicles and weapons were available in the White Line Fever supplement, but said, "as a customer, I'd be pretty perturbed to find myself shelling out 48 bucks only to find out that I need to spend another $16(!) to get what should have been included in the first place." Theisen concluded, "All in all, Dark Future is a good game — but not a great one."

In the February-March 1989 edition of Games, Matthew Costello called it "fast-paced, straight-forward in its Mad Max confrontations. And I hope that all of this automotive mayhem is therapeutic. Because it certainly is fun".

Rules expansions and scenarios published in magazines

White Dwarf
100: "Highway Warriors!" - preview 
102: Preview 
103: "Illuminations" - Review of Carl Critchlow, Thrud the Barbarian and Dark Future Artist. 
104: "Redd Harvest" - Scenario 
105: "Street Fighter" - Rules for extra-vehicular combat 
106: "A Day at the Races" - New car types and equipment for racers. 
107: "White Line Fever": Advanced Manoeuvres, and rules for Trikes and motorcycle combinations
108: "White Line Fever": Advanced Shooting 
110: "Tournament Rules" - Simplified rules for quick play
112: "St. Louis Blues" - Scenario 
124: Dead Man's Curve, part 1 - Advanced rules for campaigns, weather, darkness, psychosis, salvage, experience
125: Dead Man's Curve, part 2 - More advanced rules for success, fame, recruitment, cybernetics, hacking and gamemasters.

Challenge
 52: "Sand Cats" - Scenario

Dark Future novels

Route 666 short story anthology, edited by David Pringle, GW (1990) 
Demon Download by Kim Newman/Jack Yeovil, Boxtree Books (1990); Black Flame (2005)
Krokodil Tears by Kim Newman/Jack Yeovil, GW (1990); Boxtree Books (1991); Black Flame (2006) 
Comeback Tour by Kim Newman/Jack Yeovil, GW (1991); Boxtree Books (1991); Black Flame (2007) 
Ghost Dancers (Kid Zero in England) by Brian Craig,GW (1991); Boxtree Books (1991)
Route 666 by Kim Newman/Jack Yeovil — an expansion of the short story "Route 666" originally  published in GW's Route 666 anthology, Boxtree Books (1993); Black Flame (2006)
Golgotha Run by Dave Stone, Black Flame (2005)
American Meat by Stuart Moore,Black Flame (2005)
Jade Dragon by James Swallow, Black Flame (2006)
Reality Bites by Stuart Moore, Black Flame (October 2006)

A final book, United States Calvary, was promised in Comeback Tour (2007) but was never produced. A finished manuscript for a novel titled Violent Tendency by Eugene Byrne was lost when the writer's computer crashed.

See also
Battlecars, an earlier battling car game by Games Workshop

References

External links
Electronic journal providing support for Dark Future
Dark Future: Blood Red States is a modern reboot of the classic Mad Max-inspired boardgame
Official Site - DarkFuture.Info (Auroch Digital under licence from Games Workshop)

Alternate history games
Games Workshop games
Cultural depictions of Elvis Presley